The Botswana–Harvard AIDS Institute Partnership (BHP) is an HIV/AIDS research and training organization. It was established in 1996. It is a partnership between the Government of Botswana and the Harvard AIDS Initiative. Its goal is to further HIV/AIDS research.

References

External links 
 http://www.bhp.org.bw

Research institutes in Botswana
HIV/AIDS organizations
Medical and health organisations based in Botswana